Castelnau Le Crès FC is a French football club located in Le Crès, Hérault, Languedoc-Roussillon.

History 

Castelnau Le Crès FC was founded in 1995 in a merger between two neighbouring clubs, L'Entente Crèssoise and Entente de Castelnau. Le Crès began playing in the Division D'Honneur Languedoc-Roussillon in the 1995–96 season.  They won the league in 2003 and were promoted to the CFA 2. The club spent three seasons in the CFA 2 from 2003 to 2006 and were relegated back to the DH Languedoc-Roussillon.  The next season Le Crès were relegated to the Division Honneur Regionale, Languedoc-Roussillon where they remain today.

Colours 

Castelnau Le Crès FC play in green shirts, white shorts and green socks at home.  Their away kit is black shirts, white shorts and black socks.

Stadium 

Castelnau Le Crès FC play their home matches at the Stade Jacques Robert. It has a capacity of 1,000.

Managers 

1991–1992: Albert Rust
2002–2003: Nenad Stojković
2008–2009: Hugh Babeur
2010–2011: Pascal Dagany

Former players
 Ugo Bonnet
 Grégory Carmona
 Sébastien Gimenez
 Cédric Joqueviel
 Yvann Maçon
 Romain Rambier
 Ahmed Soukouna
 Grégory Vignal

Achievements 

 Division D'Honneur Languedoc-Roussillon
 Winners (1): 2002–03

Sport in Hérault
1995 establishments in France
Association football clubs established in 1995
Football clubs in Occitania (administrative region)